Pseudotulostoma is a genus of fungi in the family Elaphomycetaceae. The genus contains two species; one found in Guyana and one in Japan.

Species
The genus consists of the following species:

 Pseudotulostoma japonicum – Japan
 Pseudotulostoma volvata – Guyana, ectomycorrhizal with Dicymbe corymbosa

See also
 Tulostoma

References

Eurotiomycetes genera
Eurotiales